Utah State Route 267 may refer to:
Utah State Route 267 (1959-1964)
Utah State Route 267 (1966-1969)